Pinus wangii, commonly known as the Guangdong white pine , is a species of conifer in the family Pinaceae.

It was named after Dr. Shao-Ping Wang, a professor of forest genetics.

Distribution
This pine tree is native to Yunnan Province of southern China, where two populations are known from Wenshan Prefecture. It is uncertain whether it occurs in northern Vietnam.

Pinus wangii is an IUCN Red List Endangered species, threatened by continued logging. It is under second-class national protection in China.

References

wangii
Trees of China
Flora of Yunnan
Wenshan Zhuang and Miao Autonomous Prefecture
Trees of Vietnam
Endangered flora of Asia
Species endangered by logging
Taxonomy articles created by Polbot